Phytoseiulus is a genus of mites in the Phytoseiidae family. A predatory mite, this is the mite predator most frequently used to control two-spotted spider mites in greenhouses and outdoor crops grown in mild environments. This mite was accidentally introduced into Germany from Chile in 1958; it was subsequently shipped to other parts of the world, including California and Florida, from Germany. A Phytoseiulus mite can consume up to seven adult spider mites or several dozen of their eggs in a day.
Immatures and males are smaller and lighter in color. Eggs are oblong. About 80% are females. At optimum temperatures, Phytoseiidae can develop from egg to adult in seven days and live up to a month. A well-fed female lays about 50 eggs in her lifetime.

Environment

Biology
typical values @ 
sex ratio: four females/male
average eggs laid per day: 2.4
lifespan: 30–36 days - days from egg to adult: 7.5
average eggs per female: 54
population increase = 44 x in generation time of 17 days
prey consumed per day: 7 adults, 20 immatures or 25 eggs

Species
The genus Phytoseiulus contains these species:
 Phytoseiulus fragariae Denmark & Schicha, 1983
 Phytoseiulus longipes Evans, 1958
 Phytoseiulus macropilis (Banks, 1904)
 Phytoseiulus persimilis Athias-Henriot, 1957 [synonymy: Phytoseiulus riegeli Dosse, 1958; Phytoseiulus tardi (Lombardini, 1959)]
 Phytoseiulus robertsi (Baker, 1990)

References

External links
http://www.ipm.ucdavis.edu/
http://www.biocontrol.entomology.cornell.edu/predators/Phytoseiulus.php

Phytoseiidae

nl:Phytoseiulus persimilis
ja:チリカブリダニ
fi:Ansaripetopunkki